William Henry Ellerker (died 1891) was an architect and politician in Melbourne, Victoria, Australia. He was Mayor of St Kilda.

Early life
Ellerker was born in England.

Architectural career
In 1853 Ellerker immigrated to Melbourne and was employed by architect Thomas Kemp within a few weeks of his arrival.

In 1857 he was elected as an Associate of the original Institute of Architects in Melbourne, then later as a Member and Fellow. In March 1886, he took a 13-month trip to England where he was elected a Fellow of the Royal Institute of British Architects.

In 1863, he moved to Brisbane, Queensland. He submitted a design for the Queensland Parliament House, which was the initially preferred design. However, on advice from architect and politician James Cowlishaw, Ellerker's design and all others were rejected. Amidst controversy regarding the role of Queensland Colonial Architect, Charles Tiffin, in the process, another design (by Tiffin himself) was selected. Ellerker returned to Melbourne in 1866.

Local government
Ellerker initially lived in South Melbourne but later relocated to St Kilda. There he took an interest in local affairs. He was the correspondent for the local board of advice for three years. In 1881 he was elected as a councillor in the Borough of St Kilda's North ward, after which he was unanimously elected as Mayor of St Kilda. During his tenure, St Kilda was part of the redevelopment of Princes Bridge, contributing £10,000. He was also involved in protecting Albert Park from further residential development. When his term as mayor was over, he was presented with an illuminated address in appreciation of his contributions.

Other interests
Ellerker was a prominent Freemason and Orangeman. In 1886, he was appointed a Justice of the Peace.

Later life
Ellerker died on Monday 30 March 1891 at his residence in Crimea Street, St Kilda following a period of ill health. His funeral was held on Wednesday 1 April 1891 at the Melbourne General Cemetery.

Significant works
Ellerker's significant works include:
 1865: Teneriffe House, Brisbane (now listed on the Queensland Heritage Register)
 Temperance Hall, Melbourne
 Horticultural Hall, Melbourne
 Protestant Hall, Melbourne
 Carlton Hall, Melbourne (erected by James Munro, Premier of Victoria)
 Bracknell (later The Towers), residence of Sir M.H. Davies (Speaker of Victoria)
 Residence of James Munro, Armadale  (Premier of Victoria)
 Residence of C.H. James, Toorak
 Residence of B. Gibson, Royal Park

References

External links 

Year of birth missing
19th-century Australian architects
1891 deaths
Burials at Melbourne General Cemetery